Dato' Namat Abdullah  (30 March 1946 – 17 December 2020) was a Malaysian footballer. He was a part of the Malaysian squad at the 1972 Summer Olympics.

Career overview
He was born in Butterworth, Penang. Namat played as a striker when he helped Penang won the Burnley Cup in 1965 before playing as a right-back. Namat featured for the Malaysian national team in the 1972 Munich Olympics football competition, playing all three group games.  He also played for Malaysia in the 1974 World Cup qualifying matches. For a period, Namat was captain of Penang FA. He led Penang to a 2-1 victory in 1974 Malaysia Cup final against Perak.

On 11 May 1975, Namat was also part of the Malaysia Selection that played against Arsenal FC in a friendly match which his team won by 2-0 at Merdeka Stadium.

During his international career, Namat went on to play a total of 115 matches for Malaysia (including non-FIFA 'A' international matches). Against other nations' national 'A' teams, he had total of 95 caps.

In 2003, he was awarded Maal Hijrah Sports Figure by Penang Malay Association.

On 17 September 2014, FourFourTwo he was listed among the top 25 Malaysian footballers of all time.

Personal life
Shahruddin Abdullah, his brother also played for Penang and together with his uncle, Aziz Ahmad.

Death
He died at his son-in-law's residence in Taiping, Perak, Malaysia at 74 after a long battle with intestinal cancer at 5.30 pm on 17 December 2020. His body was brought to his residence in Taman Peruda, Sungai Petani the same day and his funeral was held at 9 pm the following day on 18 December 2020.

Honours
Penang
 Burnley Cup: 1964/65, 1966
 Malaysia Kings Gold Cup: 1966, 1968, 1969
 Malaysia Cup: 1974
 Aga Khan Gold Cup: 1976

Penjara
 Malaysia FAM Cup: 1970, 1971, 1973

Malaysia
 Bronze medal Asian Games: 1974
 Kings Cup: 1972
 Merdeka Cup: 1968, 1973, 1974

Individual
 OCM Hall of Fame - 1972 Summer Olympics football team: 2004
 Goal.com The best Malaysia XI of all time: 2020
IFFHS Men’s All Time Malaysia Dream Team: 2022

Orders 
  :
  Member of the Order of the Defender of the Realm (AMN) (1975)
  :
  Officer of the Order of the Defender of State (DSPN) – Dato’ (2011)

References

External links
 at Sports Council, Prison Department of Malaysia

1946 births
Malaysian footballers
Malaysia international footballers
People from Penang
Penang F.C. players
Olympic footballers of Malaysia
Footballers at the 1972 Summer Olympics
2020 deaths
Asian Games bronze medalists for Malaysia
Asian Games medalists in football
Southeast Asian Games medalists in football
Southeast Asian Games bronze medalists for Malaysia
Association football defenders
Footballers at the 1974 Asian Games
Medalists at the 1974 Asian Games
Competitors at the 1969 Southeast Asian Peninsular Games
Deaths from colorectal cancer
Deaths from cancer in Malaysia